Hans Heinz Holz (26 February 1927 – 11 December 2011) was a German Marxist philosopher.

Born in Frankfurt am Main, he was professor of philosophy at the University of Marburg (from 1971 to 1979) and from 1979 to 1993 at the  University of Groningen. He is known for his encyclopedic knowledge of the history of philosophy on one hand and for his openly expressed ideological viewpoints on the other. Influenced by Gottfried Wilhelm Leibniz's monadology, he regards Widerspiegelung (reflection) not only as an epistemological but also as an ontological category. Some critics spot here a hazard of deviating from materialism. Though Holz saw himself as in footsteps of Lenin, his vision is disputed among the leftist circles. He has contributed to far-left publications like Marxistische Blätter and Weißenseer Blätter. He joined the German Communist Party in 1994.

Works 
 Dialektik und Widerspiegelung, Köln: Pahl Rugenstein 1983
 Dialectische constructie van de totaliteit, Groningen: Uitgeverij Konstapel 1983 (co-authors Jeroen Bartels, Detlev Pätzold and Jos Lensink)
 Dialectiek als open systeem, Groningen: Uitgeverij Konstapel 1985 (co-authors Jeroen Bartels, Detlev Pätzold and Jos Lensink) 
 De actualiteit van de metafysica, Kampen: Kok-Agora 1991 
 Niederlage und Zukunft des Sozialismus, Essen: Neue Impulse Verlag 1991
 Gottfried Wilhelm Leibniz. Eine Einführung, Frankfurt/M. / New York: Campus 1992 
 Philosophische Theorie der bildenden Künste
 Band I, Der ästhetische Gegenstand. Die Präsenz des Wirklichen, Bielefeld: Aiesthesis Verlag 1996,
 Band II, Strukturen der Darstellung. Über Konstanten der ästhetischen Konfigurationen, Bielefeld: Aisthesis Verlag 1997
 Band III, Der Zerfall der Bedeutungen. Zur Funktion des ästhetischen Gegenstandes im Spätkapitalismus, Bielefeld: Aiesthesis Verlag 1997
 Einheit und Widerspruch. Problemgeschichte der Dialektik in der Neuzeit
 Band I: Die Signatur der Neuzeit, Stuttgart/Weimar: J. B. Metzler 1997
 Band II: Pluralität und Einheit, Stuttgart/Weimar: J. B. Metzler 1997
 Band III: Die Ausarbeitung der Dialektik, Stuttgart/Weimar: J. B. Metzler 1997
 Gesammelte Aufsätze aus 50 Jahren
 Band I: Der Kampf um Demokratie und Frieden, Essen: Neue Impulse Verlag 2003
 Band II: Deutsche Ideologie nach 1945, Essen: Neue Impulse Verlag 2003
 Weltentwurf und Reflexion. Versuch einer Grundlegung der Dialektik. Stuttgart/Weimar: J. B. Metzler 2005

References

1927 births
2011 deaths
20th-century German philosophers
Marxist theorists
German male writers
21st-century German philosophers